Robert de Beaumont, 3rd Earl of Leicester (1121 - 1190) was an English nobleman, one of the principal followers of Henry the Young King in the Revolt of 1173–1174 against his father King Henry II. He is also called Robert Blanchemains (French for "White Hands").

Life
He was the son of Amicia de Gael and Robert de Beaumont, 2nd Earl of Leicester, a staunch supporter of Henry II, and he inherited from his father large estates in England and Normandy.

When the revolt of the younger Henry broke out in April 1173, Robert went to his castle at Breteuil in Normandy. The rebels' aim was to take control of the duchy, but Henry II himself led an army to besiege the castle; Robert fled, and the Breteuil was taken on September 25 or 26.

Robert apparently went to Flanders, where he raised a large force of mercenaries, and landed at Walton, Suffolk, on 29 September 1173. He joined forces with Hugh Bigod, 1st Earl of Norfolk, and the two marched west, aiming to cut England in two across the Midlands and to relieve the king's siege of Robert's castle at Leicester. However, they were intercepted by the king's supporters and defeated at the Battle of Fornham near Fornham, near Bury St Edmunds, on 17 October. Robert, along with his wife and many others, were taken prisoner. Henry II took away the earl's lands and titles as well.

He remained in captivity until January 1177, well after most of the other prisoners had been released. The king was in a strong position and could afford to be merciful; not long after his release Robert's lands and titles were restored, but not his castles. All but two of his castles had been destroyed (slighted), and those two (Montsorrel in Leicestershire and Pacy in Normandy) remained in the king's hands.

Robert had little influence in the remaining years of Henry II's reign, but was restored to favour by King Richard I of England. He carried one of the swords of state at Richard's coronation in 1189. In 1190 Robert went on the Third Crusade to Palestine, but he died at Dyrrachium on his return journey.

Family
Robert married Petronilla, who was a daughter of William de Grandmesnil and great-granddaughter and eventual heiress to the English lands of Domesday baron, Hugh de Grandmesnil. They had five children:
 Robert, who succeeded his father as Earl of Leicester;
 Roger, who became Bishop of St Andrews in 1189;
 William, possibly the ancestor of the House of Hamilton;
 Amicia, who married Simon de Montfort (died 1188), and whose son Simon subsequently became Earl of Leicester;
 Margaret, who married Saer de Quincy, later 1st Earl of Winchester.

Notes

References
Ancestral Roots of Certain American Colonists Who Came to America Before 1700 by Frederick Lewis Weis; Lines 53-26, 53-27
Balfour Paul, Sir James, Scots Peerage IX vols. Edinburgh 1907.
Cowan, Samuel, The Lord Chancellors of Scotland Edinburgh 1911. 

1121 births
1190 deaths

12th-century English nobility
Anglo-Normans
Norman warriors
3rd Earl of Leicester
Lord High Stewards
Robert
Christians of the Third Crusade